Maninghem is a commune in the Pas-de-Calais department in the Hauts-de-France region of France.

Geography
Maninghem is situated 10 miles (16 km) northeast of Montreuil-sur-Mer, on the D343 road.

Population

See also
Communes of the Pas-de-Calais department

References

Communes of Pas-de-Calais